"You Baby" is a song  written by P.F. Sloan and Steve Barri and was originally recorded by the Vogues in 1965, though their version was not released until 1996.

The Turtles recording
A cover version was released by the Turtles in 1966. The song spent 12 weeks on the Billboard Hot 100 chart, peaking at No. 20, while reaching No. 15 on the Record World 100 Top Pops, No. 17 on the Cash Box Top 100, and No. 11 on Canada's "RPM Play Sheet".  Billboard described the song as a "rocker with a surf in' sound in the vocal" and a "winner."  Cash Box described it as an "easy-going, handclappin’ warm-hearted pledge of romantic devotion."

Chart performance

Other cover versions
In 1966, the song was released by the Mamas & the Papas on their debut album If You Can Believe Your Eyes and Ears.

References

1966 songs
1966 singles
Songs written by P. F. Sloan
Songs written by Steve Barri
The Turtles songs
Song recordings produced by Bones Howe